Ursula Mills is an Australian actress.

Education

Mills trained at the Western Australian Academy of Performing Arts.

Career

From 2009 to 2010, Mills was a member of the resident acting ensemble at Sydney Theatre Company, selected by then co-artistic directors, Cate Blanchett and Andrew Upton.

Mills received positive reviews in her lead role as Lian in Sue Smith's Kryptonite, a 2014 co-production between Sydney Theatre Company and State Theatre Company of South Australia.

In 2017 Ursula toured Australia playing Julia in Headlong, Almeida Theatre and Nottingham Playhouse's production of Duncan MacMillan and Robert Icke's adaptation of George Orwell's 1984 for GWB Entertainment, Ambassador Theatre Group Asia Pacific and State Theatre Company of South Australia.

Filmography and theatre

Awards

Mills was nominated for a 2014 Sydney Theatre Awards Best Actress in a Leading Role in a Mainstream Production for Kryptonite.

Other
Mills was a brand ambassador for Skins 2009–2012.

References

External links
 

Living people
Australian film actresses
Australian stage actresses
Australian television actresses
21st-century Australian actresses
Year of birth missing (living people)